Semichny is a rural locality (a khutor) and the administrative center of Semichenskoye Rural Settlement, Kotelnikovsky District, Volgograd Oblast, Russia. The population was 930 as of 2010. There are 12 streets.

Geography 
Semichny is located in steppe, 13 km west of Kotelnikovo (the district's administrative centre) by road. Kotelnikovo is the nearest rural locality.

References 

Rural localities in Kotelnikovsky District